Richard Curson Smith is a British television director and producer. He has BAFTA, Emmy, RTS, Grierson, Real Screen, Broadcast, CSA and Prix Italia awards and nominations. 

He heads his own production company, Absinthe Film Entertainment  and is married to the British television producer and author Franny Moyle and has three children.

Filmography 
 Urban Myths - Orson Welles In Norwich 2020.
 The Importance of Being Oscar 2019.
 Joe Orton Laid Bare 2017. 
 Francis Bacon: A Brush with Violence 2017. Nominee BAFTA Scotland Award
 Justice for MLK: The Hunt for James Earl Ray 2017. Nominee Canadian Screen Award
 Ted Hughes: Stronger Than Death 2016. Nominee BAFTA Scotland Award, Winner Celtic Media Award. Grierson nominee.
 THE SON OF SAM 2017. 
 RUDOLF NUREYEV: DANCE TO FREEDOM 2015. Nominee specialist factual BAFTA. Winner Dance Screen Best Film. Special mention Prix Italia.
 END OF THE DREAM 2015. Nominee Canadian Screen Award: Best Biography
 THE APARTMENT 2012
 The Making of a Lady 2012 
 THE MINOR CHARACTER 2012
 MILIBAND OF BROTHERS 2010
 PRIMEVAL 2009
 Wire in the Blood: 'Falls the Shadow''' 2008
 Consenting Adults 2007
 Pinochet in Suburbia 2006
 Agatha Christie: A Life in Pictures Nominated for a Rose d'Or Drama Award and a Grierson Award. 
 Home Nominated for an RTS Award. Nominated for 'Best Single Drama' at the Broadcast Awards.
 SURREALISSIMO! The Scandalous Success of Salvador Dali 
 IF 
 SEVEN DWARVES 
 BLUE DIAMOND BEYOND THE FATAL SHORE ANATOMY OF DESIRE 
 CNN Millennium 
 PANDEMONIUM 
 SPENDING THE KIDS' INHERITANCE 
 THE LAST MACHINE 
 DEAD PRESIDENTS EMMY nominated
 Inside Victor Lewis-Smith 
 10 x 10: WITH BOUNCING SOLES 
 BURNING MAN''

References

External links
 

British film producers
English documentary filmmakers
English television directors
British documentary film directors
Year of birth missing (living people)
Living people